"Boat Drinks"  is a song written and performed by American singer-songwriter Jimmy Buffett.  It was released as a B-side (b/w "Survive") on MCA in 1979.  Despite not being a single, it is one of his most popular songs, frequently played in concert and occasionally on the radio.

A commercial for Play FLA USA scratch-off game was noted to sound like an instrumental version of "Boat Drinks", which Buffett had not given permission for any musical licensing to the Florida Lottery. Communications specialist Kathy Wilson and a Buffett spokeswoman both later confirmed that the two songs may have sounded similar due to their "fun-in-the-sun-type" styles, but they were technically greatly different from one another.

History
The song was written in February 1979, while Jimmy was homesick in Boston.  In the 1992 box set Boats, Beaches, Bars & Ballads, Buffett writes:

Live Appearances
The song appeared on Live at Fenway Park, where Buffett said: "I'm not going to come to Boston and not play this song." This is his only song written in Boston.   While the song has been played in concert ever since it was written in 1979, it did not appear on a live release until 2005's Live in Hawaii.

Notes

1979 songs
Jimmy Buffett songs
Songs written by Jimmy Buffett